The Europe Zone was one of the three regional zones of the 1964 Davis Cup.

32 teams entered the Europe Zone, with the winner going on to compete in the Inter-Zonal Zone against the winners of the America Zone and Eastern Zone. With the increase in entries, the previous year's semifinalists were no longer granted byes into the second round, however seeding was still put in place to ensure that these countries could not meet before the semifinals.

Sweden defeated France in the final and progressed to the Inter-Zonal Zone.

Draw

First round

Great Britain vs. Austria

Ireland vs. Switzerland

Yugoslavia vs. Luxembourg

Turkey vs. Argentina

Norway vs. Portugal

France vs. Bulgaria

Netherlands vs. Hungary

Morocco vs. Soviet Union

Belgium vs. West Germany

Denmark vs. Finland

Spain vs. Brazil

Israel vs. Rhodesia

Italy vs. Egypt

Greece vs. Sweden

Second round

Great Britain vs. Ireland

Yugoslavia vs. Argentina

Norway vs. South Africa

France vs. Netherlands

West Germany vs. Soviet Union

Denmark vs. Spain

Italy vs. Rhodesia

Czechoslovakia vs. Sweden

Quarterfinals

Great Britain vs. Yugoslavia

France vs. South Africa

West Germany vs. Denmark

Italy vs. Sweden

Semifinals

Great Britain vs. France

Sweden vs. West Germany

Final

Sweden vs. France

References

External links
Davis Cup official website

Davis Cup Europe/Africa Zone
Europe Zone
Davis Cup